Wyncoop Run is a stream in Elk County, Pennsylvania, in the United States.

History
Wyncoop Run is named for John Wynkoop, a pioneer who settled near the creek in the 1820s.

See also
List of rivers of Pennsylvania

References

Rivers of Elk County, Pennsylvania
Rivers of Pennsylvania